Amer Mohamed Amer (born 14 February 1987), is an Egyptian footballer who plays for Egyptian Premier League side Ismaily and the Egyptian national team as a goalkeeper.

Career
In 2012, Amer moved to El Gouna from ENPPI and signed a 3-year contract. 3 seasons later, El Entag El Harby signed him from El Gouna for an undisclosed fee. In November 2020, he joined Ismaily.

References

External links
Amer Mohamed at KOOORA.com

1987 births
Living people
People from Sohag Governorate
Egyptian footballers
Egypt international footballers
Association football goalkeepers
Egyptian Premier League players
ENPPI SC players
El Gouna FC players
El Entag El Harby SC players
Ismaily SC players